Andrea Budošová is a former Slovak football midfielder, who last played for Slavia Prague in the Czech First Division. She has also played in the Austrian Frauenliga for USG Ardagger/Neustadtl.

She was a member of the Slovak national team.

Titles
 1 Czech Cup (2003)

References

1980 births
Living people
Slovak women's footballers
Expatriate women's footballers in Austria
People from Čadca
Sportspeople from the Žilina Region
Expatriate women's footballers in the Czech Republic
Slovak expatriate sportspeople in the Czech Republic
Slovak expatriate sportspeople in Austria
Women's association football midfielders
SK Slavia Praha (women) players
Slovakia women's international footballers
ÖFB-Frauenliga players
Czech Women's First League players